The Chapleau Centennial Museum is a local history museum in  Chapleau, Ontario, Canada. It commemorates the town's local and railway history. The monuments on display represent important aspects of the town's history and identity, such as railway workers and the Canadian Pacific Railway; First Nations, Franco-Ontarian and Anglo-Canadian peoples; and the timber industry.

Opened on the Canadian Centennial (July 1, 1967), its most visible artifact is the 275 ton locomotive steam engine  on display parallel to Elm Street.

The Museum was built almost entirely with donated materials. Local newspaper reports showed lumber donations by local mills, rocks gathered from local rock cuts, and cash donations from many individuals.

References

Museums in Sudbury District
Local museums in Ontario
Railway museums in Ontario
1967 establishments in Ontario